The 1971 population census in Bosnia and Herzegovina was the tenth census of the population of Bosnia and Herzegovina. The Socialist Federal Republic of Yugoslavia conducted a population census on 31 March 1971. 3,746,111 people populated the territory of Socialist Republic of Bosnia and Herzegovina at the time.

Overall

References 

Censuses in Bosnia and Herzegovina
1971 in Bosnia and Herzegovina
Bosnia